Phokwane Local Municipality is an administrative area in the Frances Baard District of the Northern Cape in South Africa. The name means "small Billy goat" in Setswana.

Main places
The 2011 census divided the municipality into the following main places:

Politics 

The municipal council consists of nineteen members elected by mixed-member proportional representation. Ten councillors are elected by first-past-the-post voting in ten wards, while the remaining nine are chosen from party lists so that the total number of party representatives is proportional to the number of votes received. In the election of 1 November 2021 the African National Congress (ANC) won a majority of ten seats on the council.
The following table shows the results of the election.

References

External links
 Official website

Local municipalities of the Frances Baard District Municipality